The Seventy-fourth session of the United Nations General Assembly was the session of the United Nations General Assembly which was opened on 17 of September 2019 until 16 September 2020.

The theme for the 74th Session is "Effective responses to global crises: strengthening multilateralism and dialogue among civilizations for international peace, security and development."

Organisation for the session

President 

On 4 June 2019, Nigerian diplomat and politician Tijjani Muhammad-Bande was elected by acclamation to the position of President of the General Assembly. At the time of his election, Muhammad-Bande was serving as Nigeria’s Permanent Representative to the United Nations.

In his first speech as President-elect of the General Assembly, Muhammad-Bande laid out some of his priorities for the session. Paramount among them was the need to meet the Sustainable Development Goals, with particular attention being paid to peace and security, poverty eradication, zero hunger, quality education and climate action. He also pledged to focus on the promotion of human rights, as well as the empowerment of women and youth and gender parity in the United Nations system.

Vice-Presidents 
On 4 June 2019, the General Assembly elected the following countries as the vice-presidents of the 74th Session:

The five permanent members of the Security Council:
 
 
 
  
 

As well as the following nations:

Committees 
The following were elected as Chairs and officers of the General Assembly's Main Committees for the 74th Session:

Seat allocation 
As is tradition before each session of the General Assembly, the Secretary-General drew lots to see which member state would occupy the first seat in the General Assembly Chamber, with the other member states following according to the English translation of their name. For the 74th Session, Ghana was selected to sit in the first seat by Secretary-General António Guterres. This same order is followed in the six main committees, as well as other United Nations bodies.

General Debate 

Each member of the General Assembly will have a representative speaking about issues concerning their country and the hopes for the coming year as to what the UNGA will do. This is an opportunity for the member states to opine on international issues of their concern. The General Debate will occur from the 24th of September to the 30th of September 2019.

The order of speakers is given first to member states, then observer states and supranational bodies. Any other observers entities will have a chance to speak at the end of the debate if they so choose. Speakers will be put on the list in the order of their request, with special consideration for ministers and other government officials of similar or higher rank. According to the rules in place for the General Debate, the statements should be in one of the United Nations official languages of Arabic, Chinese, English, French, Russian or Spanish, and will be translated by the United Nations translators. Each speaker is requested to provide 20 advance copies of their statements to the conference officers to facilitate translation and to be presented at the podium. Speeches are requested to be limited to five minutes, with seven minutes for supranational bodies.

Resolutions 
The following are resolutions the General Assembly has passed in its 74th session.

References

External links 
 Official website for the 74th Session
 President of the 74th Session
 Agenda for the 74th Session

2019 in the United Nations
2020 in the United Nations
Sessions of the United Nations General Assembly
United Nations General Assembly resolutions